Sobibór  is a village in the administrative district of Gmina Włodawa, within Włodawa County, Lublin Voivodeship, in eastern Poland. It lies close to the Bug River, which forms the border with Belarus and Ukraine.

Overview

To the south and west is the protected area called Sobibór Landscape Park.

During World War II, the Nazi Sobibor extermination camp was built outside the village. The number of Jews gassed and cremated there between April 1942 and October 14, 1943 is estimated at 250,000. At present, the site of Jewish martyrology is the location of the Sobibór Museum branch of the Majdanek State Museum, devoted to the memory of atrocities committed by Nazi Germany at the Sobibór death camp during the Holocaust in Poland.

References

 "Sobibór" Słownik geograficzny Królestwa Polskiego i innych krajów słowiańskich, Vol. X ("Rukszenice – Sochaczew"), 1889.

Villages in Włodawa County
Siedlce Governorate
Kholm Governorate
Lublin Voivodeship (1919–1939)